The Kingdom of the Isles comprised the Hebrides, the islands of the Firth of Clyde and the Isle of Man from the 9th to the 13th centuries AD. The historical record is incomplete and the kingdom was probably not a continuous entity throughout the entire period. The islands concerned are sometimes referred to as the "Kingdom of Mann and the Isles", although only some of the later rulers claimed that title. At times the rulers were independent of external control, although for much of the period they had overlords in Norway, Ireland, England, Scotland or Orkney. At times there also appear to have been competing claims for all or parts of the territory.

Viking influence in the area commenced in the late 8th century, and whilst there is no doubt that the Uí Ímair dynasty played a prominent role in this early period, the records for the dates and details of the rulers are speculative until the mid-10th century. Hostility between the Kings of the Isles and the rulers of Ireland, and intervention by the crown of Norway (either directly or through their vassals the Earls of Orkney) were recurring themes.

Invasion by Magnus Barelegs in the late 11th century resulted in a brief period of direct Norwegian rule over the kingdom, but soon the descendants of Godred Crovan re-asserted a further period of largely independent overlordship. This came to an end with the emergence of Somerled, on whose death in 1164 the kingdom was split in two. Just over a century later the islands became part of the Kingdom of Scotland, following the 1266 Treaty of Perth.

The orthography of the rulers' names is complicated as Old Norse and Gaelic were both spoken throughout the region for much of period under consideration. Thus a single individual might be referred to as Rognvaldr in Icelandic sources, Rag(h)nall in Gaelic, Reginaldus in Latin and perhaps "Rognvald" or "Reginald" in English language sources.

9th and early 10th centuries
During this period the historical record is particularly sparse and these early entries must be considered as somewhat speculative.

It is also possible that Eiríkr, King of York from 947–948 and 952–5, was a ruler in the islands at some stage in the mid-10th century. Eiríkr is believed by some authorities to be synonymous with the saga character Eric Bloodaxe, although the connection is questioned by Downham (2007), who argues that the former was an Uí Ímair dynast rather than a son of Harald Fairhair. A raid on Northumbria in 949, the purpose of which may have been either to support or oppose the kingship of Amlaíb Cuarán is described as predam albidosorum idem nannindisi in the Chronicle of the Kings of Alba. Alfred P. Smyth translated this as "the raid of the men from beyond the spine of Britain, that is, of the islands."

Late 10th and 11th centuries

Early rulers of Mann
Various rulers have been identified as ruling Man, but not the Isles as a whole. The Isle of Man may have fallen under Norse rule in the 870s, and paradoxically they may have brought the Gaelic language with them. The island has produced a more densely distributed Viking Age archaeology than anywhere else in the British Isles, but the written records for this time period are poor.

There then follows a period when it is likely that the Western Isles and Mann were jointly held by rulers of the House of Ímar (see above). Downham (2007) suggests Lagmann Godredson may have "wielded power in Man" and possibly even have been king but was expelled sometime after 1005, perhaps by Brian Bóruma. This may indicate that the Earls of Orkney did not control Man itself in the early 11th century. Echmarcach mac Ragnaill and his successors certainly did control Mann, but the extent of their rule over the islands of the Clyde and the Hebrides is not clear. Óláfr mac Lagmann (or Lagmainn) is recorded as having been killed at Clontarf in 1014, fighting with "warriors from the Hebrides".

The period 1095–1098 seems to have been politically unsettled, culminating in a Manx civil war between the north and south of the island. A battle at Santwat between the northerners under Jarl Óttar and the southerners under Macmaras (or MacManus) in 1098 resulted in the deaths of both leaders.

Early rulers of the Hebrides

In Irish mythology the Outer Hebrides were the home of the Fomorians, described as "huge and ugly" and "ship men of the sea". They were pirates, extracting tribute from the coasts of Ireland and one of their kings was Indech mac Dé Domnand (i.e. Indech, son of the goddess Domnu, who ruled over the deep seas). Indech is also mentioned in the Cath Maige Tuired along with Balor grandson of Nét, his rival who is described as righ na n-Innsi ('king of the Isles'), which may have meant the king of the Inner Hebrides. Together they "gathered all the forces from Lochlainn westwards into Ireland to impose their tribute and their rule over them."

Various later rulers such as Gebeachan are also mentioned in early sources as having a role of some kind over unspecified areas of the northern part of the Kingdom of the Isles.

12th and 13th centuries

Kings of Mann and the Isles

Godred the Black's dictatorial style appears to have made him very unpopular with the Islesmen, and the powerful barons of the isles began plotting with an emerging and forceful figure – Somerled, Lord of Argyll. When Godred heard of this he engaged Somerled's forces in the naval Battle of Epiphany in 1156. There was no clear victor, but it was subsequently agreed that Godred would remain the ruler of Man and the northern Hebrides, whilst Somerled's young sons would nominally control the southern Inner Hebrides, Kintyre and the islands of the Clyde under their father's supervision. Two years later Somerled's invasion of the Isle of Man caused Godred to flee to Norway, leaving the former as the undisputed ruler of the entire realm.

Following the death of Somerled in 1164 Godred re-took possession of his pre-1158 territories in Mann and the north and the southern isles were distributed amongst Somerled's sons as had been previously agreed: Dubgall received Mull, Coll, Tiree and Jura; Islay and Kintyre went to Ragnall; Bute to Aonghas, with Arran possibly divided between him and Reginald. The Chronicle of Man and the Sudreys lamented that Somerled's marriage to Ragnhildis, daughter of Olave the Red, had been "the cause of the ruin of the whole kingdom of the Isles".

Kings of Mann and the North Isles

In a precursor to 1263, Norwegian forces invaded in 1230 in response to dynastic struggles amongst Godred the Black's descendants. The Chronicle of Lanercost states that a Norwegian fleet sailed down the west coast of Scotland with Óspakr-Hákon, who had been appointed "King of the Suðreyjar" by the King of Norway (and who may have been a son of Dubgall mac Somairle). His forces took Rothesay Castle, hacking through the walls with their axes. The Eirspennill version of Hákonar saga Hákonarsonar states that the fleet then sailed to Kintyre where Óspakr-Hákon fell ill and died. Olaf the Black then took control of the fleet, and led it to the Isle of Man. He and Gofraid Donn, the son of Raghnall mac Gofraidh, divided the kingdom between themselves, with the latter retaining Mann, and the former controlling the northern islands. A short time later Gofraid Donn was slain, possibly on Lewis.

On 30 May 1249, Ragnvald Olafsson was slain in a meadow near the Church of the Holy Trinity at Rushen by a knight named Ívarr, along with several of the knight's followers. The Chronicle of Lanercost states that he had reigned for only 27 days. Harald Godredsson then seized the kingship, although he was summoned to Norway the following year and effectively dispossessed. Magnus Olafsson was the last of the Norse kings to rule Mann, which was absorbed into the Kingdom of Scotland on his death.

Kings of the South Isles

The 1780 Anecdotes of Olave the Black (which are based on Hákonar saga Hákonarsonar) state that there were 3 Sudreyan kings all existing at one time who were "of the family of Somerled" and who were "very untrue to King Haco". It is not entirely clear which three kings are being referred to. They include Dubgall "Screech" mac Dubgaill and his brother Donnchadh and either Eóghan of Argyll who "was king afterwards" or possibly an unknown "relation of theirs, called Somerled, [who] was then also a King in the Sudreys". This Somerled, who died in 1230, may have been a brother or cousin of Dubgall and Donnchadh.

Ragnall mac Somairle's son, Ruaidhri mac Raghnaill may have been the "king of the Isles" who was recorded in the Irish chronicles as having been killed fighting against the English at the Battle of Ballyshannon in 1247. Ruaidhri's direct descendants Dubhghall and Ailean, who ruled Garmoran and the Uists are generally not given titles by Scottish sources. However the Icelandic Annals recorded for the year 1249 that: "Dubhghall took kingship in the Sudreys." Norse sources also refer to kingship being held by Eóghan of Argyll, although this was rescinded by King Haakon when he refused to participate in the latter's expeditions against Scotland.

See also
List of Manx consorts
Lists of monarchs in the British Isles
Lord of the Isles

References
Notes

Footnotes

General references

Anderson, Alan Orr (1922) Early Sources of Scottish History: A.D. 500 to 1286. 2. Edinburgh. Oliver and Boyd.
 Barrett, James H. "The Norse in Scotland" in Brink, Stefan (ed) (2008) The Viking World. Abingdon. Routledge. 
 Coventry, Martin (2008) Castles of the Clans. Musselburgh. Goblinshead. 
 Crawford, Barbara E. (1987) Scandinavian Scotland. Leicester University Press. 
 Downham, Clare (2007)"England and the Irish Sea Zone in the Eleventh Century" Anglo-Norman Studies, 26, pp. 55–73.https://www.academia.edu/1763453/England_and_the_Irish_Sea_Zone_in_the_Eleventh_Century
 Downham, Clare (2007) Viking Kings of Britain and Ireland: The Dynasty of Ívarr to A.D. 1014. Edinburgh. Dunedin Academic Press. 
 

 Etchingham, Colman (2001) "North Wales, Ireland and the Isles: the Insular Viking Zone". Peritia. 15 pp. 145–87
 Gregory, Donald (1881) The History of the Western Highlands and Isles of Scotland 1493–1625. Edinburgh. Birlinn. 2008 reprint – originally published by Thomas D. Morrison. 
  Also JSTOR.
 Hunter, James (2000) Last of the Free: A History of the Highlands and Islands of Scotland. Edinburgh. Mainstream. 
 Johnstone J. (ed) (1780) Anecdotes Of Olave The Black, King Of Man, And The Hebridian Princes Of The Somerled Family (by Thordr) To Which Are Added Xviii. Eulogies On Haco King Of Norway, By Snorro Sturlson, Publ. With A Literal Version And Notes. Retrieved 27 December 2012.
 McDonald, R. Andrew (1997) The Kingdom of the Isles: Scotland's Western Seaboard c. 1100 – c. 1336. East Linton. Tuckwell Press. 
 McDonald, R. Andrew (2007) Manx Kingship in its Irish Sea setting, 1187–1229: King Rognavaldr and the Crovan dynasty. Dublin. Four Courts Press. .
Marsden, John (2008) "Somerled and the Emergence of Gaelic Scotland". Edinburgh. Birlinn. 
Munch, P.A. (ed) and Rev. Goss (tr) (1874) Chronica regnum Manniae et insularum: The Chronicle of Man and the Sudreys. Volume 1. Douglas, Isle of Man. The Manx Society. Retrieved 9 January 2011.
 Ó Corráin, Donnchadh (Mar 1979) "High-Kings, Vikings and Other Kings". Irish Historical Studies 22 No. 83 pp. 283–323. Irish Historical Studies Publications.
 Ó Corráin, Donnchadh (1998) Vikings in Ireland and Scotland in the Ninth Century CELT. Retrieved 27 December 2012.
 Pálsson, Hermann and Edwards, Paul Geoffrey (1981). Orkneyinga Saga: The History of the Earls of Orkney. Penguin Classics. 
.
 Sellar, William David Hamilton Hebridean sea kings: The successors of Somerled, 1164–1316 in Cowan, Edward J. and McDonald, Russell Andrew (eds) (2000) Alba: Celtic Scotland in the middle ages. Tuckwell Press. 
 Thomson, William P. L. (2008) The New History of Orkney. Edinburgh. Birlinn. 
 Watson, W. J. (1994) The Celtic Place-Names of Scotland. Edinburgh; Birlinn. . First published 1926.
 Woolf, Alex (2005) "The origins and ancestry of Somerled: Gofraid mac Fergusa and 'The Annals of the Four Masters'". Mediaeval Scandinavia. 15 pp. 199–213.
 Woolf, Alex "The Age of the Sea-Kings: 900–1300" in Omand, Donald (2006) The Argyll Book. Edinburgh. Birlinn. 
 Woolf, Alex (2007) From Pictland to Alba, 789–1070. The New Edinburgh History of Scotland. Edinburgh University Press. 

Lists of monarchs
Monarchs
 
Kingdom of the Isles

Norway–Scotland relations